This is an episode guide for the Gerry Anderson television series Supercar, made for the British production company ITC Entertainment and first broadcast between 1961 and 1962 on ATV Midlands. Episodes are listed in original ATV Midlands broadcast order.  All episodes were made in black-and-white.

Series One (1961)

Series Two (1962)

References

External links

List of Supercar episodes (Series One) at Fanderson.org.uk
List of Supercar episodes (Series Two) at Fanderson.org.uk
"Island Incident" Episode Review in Andersonic fanzine

Lists of British children's television series episodes
Lists of British science fiction television series episodes